The Malaysian giant turtle or Bornean river turtle (Orlitia borneensis) is a species of turtle in the family Bataguridae. It is monotypic within the genus Orlitia. It is found in Indonesia and Malaysia.

This species is the largest freshwater turtle in Southeast Asia, reaching a maximum length of 80 cm (31 inches) and a maximum weight of up to 50 kg (110 pounds). It inhabits large lakes, swamps, and slow-flowing rivers. This mainly piscivorous (fish-eating) species has a dark brown or black carapace which is smooth and oval in shape and a pale yellowish-brown to off-white plastron. The head is powerful, with strong jaws and a slightly projecting snout, and the heads of adults are uniformly colored dark brown to black whereas juveniles are dark mottled with a pale line extending from the mouth to the back of the head.  It occasionally takes fallen fruit and may consume and other available vertebrate. This species is exported in huge amounts from Indonesia for its highly prized flesh and despite its rarity it is not protected in Malaysia. Habitat destruction for palm oil plantations and poaching for the Chinese medicinal trade have also contributed to its Critically Endangered IUCN status.

References

Geoemydidae
Reptiles described in 1873
Taxa named by John Edward Gray
Reptiles of Indonesia
Reptiles of Malaysia
Taxonomy articles created by Polbot
Reptiles of Borneo